Vishkanya is a 1991 Hindi action fantasy film of Bollywood, directed by Jag Mundhra and produced by Salila Parida. This is the debut movie of Indian actress, model Pooja Bedi and Riya Sen as the child actress. This film was released on 30 July 1991.

Plot 
Inspector Rakesh Verma is investigating a case of mysterious deaths in a remote village. His investigations take him to meet two people, namely Thakur Dhurjan Singh and Lala Lachiram, both fearful for their lives. Rakesh learns that both are connected to the criminal activities. He is required to provide protection to them. His investigations revealed that one Trilokchand, a former jailbird, is a prime suspect. But presently, Trilok is confined to a wheelchair. Rakesh now realises that it is a revenge story of a young girl for her parents' murder. Long ago, Thakur Durjan Singh and Lala Lachiram were involved with illegal snake skin smuggling. One day, forest officer Vikram Singh comes into their circle with his wife Sonali and daughter Nisha. Vikram Singh tries to arrest the smugglers, and they kill Vikram and Sonali. Only Nisha is left. Nisha's Grandpa Trilokchand comes into the house and sees the dead bodies; he promises, that he must take revenge. He is framed by Zoravar, and Trilok is found guilty of murder and serves 11 years in jail. Nisha, although a simple girl of a village, recollects the murder scene of his parents. Her uncle Bajrang takes her to a Tantrik's who gives a snake poison pill to Nisha, and due to such pill, she becomes a Vishkanya (Poison girl). When her grandfather Trilok returns from jail, they jointly take revenge.

Cast 
 Kunal Goswami as Inspector Rakesh
 Pooja Bedi as Nisha
 Kabir Bedi as Vikram Singh
 Moon Moon Sen as Mrs. Vikram
 Satish Kaushik as Lala Lachiram
 Goga Kapoor as Durjan Singh
 Ananth Narayan Mahadevan as Bajrang
 Rajesh Vivek
 Surendra Pal
 Riya Sen as Baby Nisha
 Vikas Anand as DIG
 Akash Khurana as Trilokchand

Soundtrack

References 

1991 films
1990s Hindi-language films
Indian fantasy action films
Films scored by Bappi Lahiri
Indian films about revenge
Films about snakes
Films about shapeshifting
Films directed by Jag Mundhra

External links